Michael George Chartak (April 28, 1916 – July 25, 1967) was an American professional baseball outfielder. He played in Major League Baseball (MLB) for the New York Yankees (1940, 1942), Washington Senators (1942), and St. Louis Browns (1942–1944).

Chartak was born in 1916, in Brooklyn, New York, and grew up in Carbondale, Pennsylvania. Mike played four seasons in the major leagues: 1940 with the New York Yankees; 1942 with the Yankees, Washington Senators, and St. Louis Browns; and 1943–1944 with the Browns. In his major league career, Chartak appeared in 256 games and had 186 hits, including 21 home runs, in 765 at bats. He appeared as a pinch hitter in two games of the 1944 World Series, the second appearance resulting in a strikeout to end the sixth and final game. His strikeout that ended the 1944 World Series was the last at-bat of his career.

He died of tuberculosis on July 25, 1967, in Cedar Rapids, Iowa at age 51.

References

David Alan Heller, As Good As It Got: The 1944 St. Louis Browns. 2003 Arcadia Publishing, 
Obituary, The Sporting News, Aug. 12, 1967, p. 38

External links
Baseball-Reference.com page

1916 births
1967 deaths
Baseball players from New York (state)
Major League Baseball outfielders
New York Yankees players
Washington Senators (1901–1960) players
20th-century deaths from tuberculosis
Tuberculosis deaths in Iowa